José Urea (born 6 July 1967) is a Spanish former racing cyclist. He rode in the 1990 Tour de France as well as two editions of the Giro d'Italia and Vuelta a España.

Major results
1989
 1st Stage 11 Volta a Portugal
 3rd Overall Volta ao Alentejo
1999
 2nd Overall Vuelta a Navarra

References

External links
 

1967 births
Living people
Spanish male cyclists
Sportspeople from Jaén, Spain
Cyclists from Andalusia